Avram Bunaciu (11 November 1909 – 28 April 1983) was a Romanian communist politician who served as the Minister of Justice, Minister of Foreign Affairs and was the acting President of the State Council of Romania.

Early life and political career 
Bunaciu was born in 1909 in Gurba, a village not far from Arad, to a Romanian peasant family. Some far-right sources have claimed that he was of Jewish origin; however, according to recent research by Romanian historians, this claim has been discredited. During World War I, he and his elder brother were mobilized in the army and the family lived in poverty.

After graduating from the Samuil Vulcan High School in Beiuș, he studied Law from 1929 to 1933 at the University of Cluj. He was a communist intellectual during World War II and had several high ranking positions after the war, mostly within the Ministry of Justice. Bunaciu was a lawyer by profession and close ally to Ion Gheorghe Maurer, with whom he defended communists at pre-war trials; he was also close to Gheorghe Gheorghiu-Dej, who eventually became the President of the State Council and de facto ruler of Romania. 

After the war, Bunaciu was one of the main prosecutors of the People's Tribunals. There were two such tribunals in post-war Romania (one in Bucharest and one in Cluj) which were charged with trials of individuals involved in war crimes. From May 30 to June 4, 1945, together with Alexandra Sidorovici, Constantin Vicol, and Ion D. Ioan, he prosecuted in Bucharest a dozen prominent journalists, including Pan M. Vizirescu, Stelian Popescu, Nichifor Crainic, and Radu Gyr. Afterwards, Bunaciu was the Chief Public Prosecutor at the Cluj tribunal, which was set up on 22 June 1945 to prosecute war criminals. Bunaciu was involved in prosecuting mainly crimes committed by Hungarian authorities and their collaborators in Northern Transylvania, while the Bucharest tribunal mostly dealt with crimes perpetrated by Romanians under Marshal Ion Antonescu.

State career
Bunaciu served as the Minister of Justice of Romania from 25 March 1948 until 23 September 1949.
In 1952, Bunaciu was appointed Deputy Minister of Foreign Affairs when Ana Pauker was the minister. At the time he also was the Chairman of the National Assembly for the Application of Constitution. When Pauker was sacked by the communist leadership aided by Joseph Stalin, Bunaciu left the foreign service and became the rector of the University of Bucharest in 1954. On 13 January 1958 he was appointed Minister of Foreign Affairs. On 20 March 1961, when he left the Ministry of Foreign Affairs, he was elected Vice President of the State Council. From 19 March to 24 March 1965, before Nicolae Ceaușescu came to power, he was the acting President of the State Council.

Personal life
He married Noemi Nussbacher (at the time, a fellow communist sympathiser) in Cluj in 1938; the Bunacius had two children, Tudor and Doina, a physicist now living in Switzerland. He died in 1983 in Bucharest.

See also
Romanian Communist Party
Foreign relations of Romania
Romanian People's Tribunals

References

1909 births
1983 deaths
People from Arad County
Babeș-Bolyai University alumni
Romanian jurists
Romanian Communist Party politicians
Romanian Ministers of Foreign Affairs
Romanian Ministers of Justice
State Council of Romania
Academic staff of the University of Bucharest
Rectors of the University of Bucharest